The Prince Albert is a pub and music venue located in Trafalgar Street, Brighton, East Sussex. It was originally a three-storey town house built in 1848 and it was converted into a pub in 1860.

Mural - "Icons"
The most iconic feature of the pub is a mural painted on the side. Originally, the wall was known for its Banksy artwork Kissing Coppers appearing in 2004, along with a mural of the late BBC Radio 1 DJ John Peel. In 2013, a mural depicting 26 deceased musicians, the actor Oliver Reed and footballer George Best was added to the wall by local graffiti artists Req and Sinna One. These depictions are  mostly monochrome, set against a vividly multicoloured background. The following musicians were painted:

Amy Winehouse
Bob Marley
Brian Jones
Captain Beefheart
Donna Summer
Dusty Springfield
Elvis Presley
Frank Sidebottom
Frank Zappa
Freddie Mercury
George Harrison
Ian Curtis
Ian Drury
James Brown
Jim Morrison
Jimi Hendrix
Joe Strummer
John Lennon
Johnny Cash
Keith Moon
Kurt Cobain
Marc Bolan
Marvin Gaye 
Michael Jackson
Phil Lynott
Sandy Denny
Syd Barrett

The mural was repainted in 2017 and updated regularly thereafter to include another 24 deceased musicians. Of the original depictions, Brian Jones is missing and George Best was later replaced. There is debate about the identity of the musician depicted on the left chimney situated between Ian Curtis and Kurt Cobain. Some sources incorrectly list Merle Haggard. The following musicians were added:

2Pac
Alan Vega
Aretha Franklin
Chester Bennington
Chuck Berry
David Bowie
Dolores O'Riordan
Gary Moore
George Michael
Glen Campbell
Janis Joplin
Lemmy
Leonard Cohen
Lou Reed
Mark E. Smith
Mick Ronson
The Notorious B.I.G.
Prince
Ronnie James Dio
Rory Gallagher
Sid Vicious
Tom Petty
Vivian Stanshall
Whitney Houston

A new mural was painted in 2019 across the upstairs hallway with depictions of Scott Walker and Pete Shelley.

See also
List of landmarks and buildings of Brighton and Hove
Pubs in Brighton

References

External links
Official website

Grade II listed buildings in Brighton and Hove
Pubs in Brighton and Hove